Nurul Farhanah Binti Johari (born ) is a Malaysian female former weightlifter, who competed in the 69 kg category and represented Malaysia at international competitions. She competed at the 2009 Southeast Asian Games.

Major results

References

1988 births
Living people
Malaysian female weightlifters
Place of birth missing (living people)
Southeast Asian Games competitors for Malaysia
Competitors at the 2009 Southeast Asian Games